The Entreprise nationale de radiodiffusion sonore (ENRS, the National Sound Broadcasting Company, Algerian Radio, or Radio Algérienne; in ) is Algeria's state-owned public radio broadcasting organisation. The group provides services in Arabic, French and Berber and currently operates six national stations and one international plus a network of regional stations.

The ENRS is a member of the European Broadcasting Union.

History
Formed in 1986 when the previous Algerian Radio and Television company (established in 1962) was split into four enterprises. The origins of Algerian radio go back to the clandestine station that the National Liberation Front launched in December 1956, and which was active during the war of independence. At its conclusion in 1962, Algeria became independent from France and the transitional government nationalized the media to form a new company,  (RTA), which took over the functions of the old Radiodiffusion-Télévision Française (RTF) on October 28, 1962. then with three radio stations and a television channel. Three years later it expanded its coverage throughout the national territory.

Algerian Radio became a public industrial and commercial establishment (EPIC) by executive decree no. 91-102 of April 20, 1991. A specification defining the missions of Algerian radio was also published in April 1991.

Services
Chaîne 1, generalist station in Arabic
Chaîne 2, generalist station in Berber
Chaîne 3, generalist station in French
Algeria Quran Radio, station dedicated to reading the Quran in Arabic, Berber and French.
Radio Culture, cultural radio station in Arabic.
Jil FM, youth music station.

There is also one international station, Radio Algérie Internationale, broadcasting in four languages (Arabic, French, Spanish and English) on shortwave via the relay station in Issoudun, France, and a large network of local stations (Radio Adrar, Radio El Bahia, Radio Biskra, Radio Blida, Radio Soummam, etc.).

See also
Entreprise nationale de télévision (Algerian state television)
Communications in Algeria

References

External links

www.radioalgerie.dz

Arabic-language television stations
French-language television stations
Berber-language mass media
Government-owned companies of Algeria
Publicly funded broadcasters
European Broadcasting Union members
Radio stations in Algeria
Multilingual broadcasters
Radio stations established in 1986
1986 establishments in Algeria
State media